Nathalie Le Bot is a French biologist and the chief life sciences editor of Nature Communications.

Education 
She is a graduate of École normale supérieure (Paris) having studied molecular and cell biology before joining the European Molecular Biology Laboratory graduate program in 1995.

Career 
After graduating, Le Bot undertook postdoctoral research at Gurdon Institute in Cambridge. where she studied early embryonic development in caenorhabditis elegans.

Le Bot worked for fourteen years in the editorial department of Nature Cell Biology and Nature before joining Nature Communications in 2019.

Selected publications 

 Kamath RS, Fraser AG, Dong Y, Poulin G, Durbin R, Gotta M, Kanapin A, Le Bot N, Moreno S, Sohrmann M, Welchman DP., Systematic functional analysis of the Caenorhabditis elegans genome using RNAi, Nature, 2003, Jan;421(6920):231-7

Family life 
Le Bot lives in London, UK

References 

Living people
Academic journal editors
20th-century French biologists
French women biologists
École Normale Supérieure alumni
Year of birth missing (living people)